Radovan Jovanović (Cyrillic: Раде Јовановић ; Parcani, Sopot, 1904 - Slatina, Sopot, 25 September 1941) was a Serbian communist partisan. He was elevated to a National Hero of Yugoslavia in 1951.

References

1904 births
1941 deaths
Recipients of the Order of the People's Hero